Salix amygdaloides, the peachleaf willow, is a species of willow native to central North America east of the Cascade Range. It can be found in southern Canada and the United States—from western British Columbia to Quebec, Idaho, Montana and Arizona to eastern Kentucky.

It has a single trunk, or sometimes several shorter trunks.

The peachleaf willow grows very quickly, but is short-lived. It can be found on the northern prairies, often near streams, and accompanying cottonwoods. As the common and scientific names suggest, the leaves bear some similarity to those of a peach and (even more so) of an almond.

References

External links 
 
 
 

amygdaloides
Trees of the Plains-Midwest (United States)
Trees of the Western United States
Trees of Western Canada
Trees of the Great Lakes region (North America)
Flora of the North-Central United States
Flora of the Rocky Mountains
Flora of Colorado
Flora of Montana
Flora of New Mexico
Flora of Wyoming
Trees of the North-Central United States
Trees of the Northeastern United States
Flora without expected TNC conservation status